The following is a list of events affecting Canadian television in 2022. Events listed include television show debuts, finales, cancellations, and channel launches, closures and rebrandings.

Events

February

November

December

Programs

Programs debuting in 2022

Programs ending in 2022

Specials

Shows returning in 2022
The following shows will return with new episodes after being canceled or ended their run previously:

Networks and services

Network conversions and rebrandings

Closures

Deaths
 May 5 – Kenneth Welsh, actor (Twin Peaks) (born 1942)
 September 8 – Elizabeth II, Queen of Canada (born 1926); her coronation was a landmark moment for Canadian television

References